George Silvernail (16 January 1928 – 6 March 2015) was a Puerto Rican sports shooter. He competed in the trap event at the 1968 Summer Olympics.

References

1928 births
2015 deaths
Puerto Rican male sport shooters
Olympic shooters of Puerto Rico
Shooters at the 1968 Summer Olympics
People from Vicente López Partido
Sportspeople from Buenos Aires Province